This is a comprehensive list of characters from the Channel 4 soap opera Brookside in alphabetical order by the character's surnames.

A

B

C

D

E

F

G

H

I

J

K

L

M

N

O

P

R

S

T

V

W

Y

Brookside
Brookside
Brookside